The 1976 Clemson Tigers football team was an American football team that represented Clemson University in the Atlantic Coast Conference (ACC) during the 1976 NCAA Division I football season. In its fourth and final season under head coach Red Parker, the team compiled a 3–6–2 record (0–4–1 against conference opponents), finished in last place in the ACC, and was outscored by a total of 237 to 172. The team played its home games at Memorial Stadium in Clemson, South Carolina.

Malcolm Marler, Mike O'Cain, Randy Scott, and Joey Walters were the team captains. The team's statistical leaders included Steve Fuller with 835 passing yards and 36 points scored (6 touchdowns), Warren Ratchford with 676 rushing yards, and Jerry Butler with 484 receiving yards.

Schedule

References

Clemson
Clemson Tigers football seasons
Clemson Tigers football